Dual-mode mostly refers to vehicle related technologies in terms of used infrastructure:
Dual-mode vehicles
or in terms of power source:
Dual-mode bus
Global Hybrid Cooperation for the General Motors/DaimlerChrysler/BMW hybrid vehicle technology often called "Dual-Mode"
Electro-diesel locomotives, sometimes called "dual-mode" or "dual-mode power" locomotives
It can also refer to:
Dual-mode mobiles